Alex Bolt and Bradley Mousley were the defending champions but only Mousley chose to defend his title, partnering Pedro Martínez. Mousley lost in the first round to Hiroki Moriya and Mohamed Safwat.

Max Purcell and Luke Saville won the title after defeating Moriya and Safwat 7–5, 6–4 in the final.

Seeds

Draw

References
 Main draw

Launceston Tennis International - Men's Doubles